Marie Chatardová (born 6 March 1963) is a Czech diplomat, currently the Czech ambassador to the United Kingdom. She is the first woman appointed to this post since 1918. In 2017, Forbes magazine named Chatardova as the fourth most influential woman in the Czech Republic.

Early life and education 
Marie Chatardová was born in Znojmo, in the South Moravian Region of Czechoslovakia. Her family comes from around the village of Mramotice. She moved to Brno aged 10 and studied at Gymnázium Křenová. In 1985, she qualified as a Doctor of Law from the Faculty of Law at Masaryk University in Brno. In 1992, she joined the Chamber of Commercial Lawyers.

Professional career 
From 1985 to 1990, Marie Chatardová was employed at the Trademarks Office in Prague. After the Velvet Revolution, she became a lawyer, specializing in Business Law. 

In 1994, she entered the Czech Ministry of Foreign Affairs and worked for one year at the Department of Analysis and Planning. She was then sent to the Czech Permanent Mission to the European Union in Brussels, in charge of the Justice and Home Affairs Agenda before Czech accession to the EU. In 1999, she came back to Prague and served as Head of Unit within the Department of the Coordination of EU Relations. In 2000, she was appointed as Director of the Department of Strategic Communication at the Ministry of Foreign Affairs. 

From 2002 to 2007, Chatardová was the Czech Ambassador to Sweden. After this, she returned to the Czech Republic to become Director of the Department of Protocol at the Ministry of Foreign Affairs, from 2007 to 2010. From 2010 to 2016, Chatardová was the Czech Ambassador to France and Monaco, and the Permanent Delegate of the Czech Republic to the International Organisation of La Francophonie. 

In 2013, she became the Permanent Delegate of the Czech Republic to UNESCO (2013-2016), and was elected as Chair of the organization's Committee on Conventions and Recommendations (2013-2015).

In 2016, she was appointed as the Permanent Representative of the Czech Republic to the United Nations. In July 2017, she was elected as the 73rd President of the Economic and Social Council of the United Nations (ECOSOC).

Teaching 
Aside from her own career, Chatardova has held teaching positions at the Faculty of Social Sciences of Charles University (Institute of Western European studies), Anglo-American University (School of International Relations and Diplomacy), the Institute of Public Administration in Prague, and the Diplomatic Academy in Prague.

Personal life 
Chatardová is married to Benoît E. Chatard. They have three children.

Honours 
  Commander of the National Order of the Legion of Honour (France; 2016)
  Officer of the Order of Saint-Charles (Monaco; 2016)

References 

1963 births
Living people
United Nations Economic and Social Council
Czech women diplomats
Ambassadors of the Czech Republic to France
Ambassadors of the Czech Republic to Sweden
Ambassadors of the Czech Republic to Monaco
Czech women ambassadors
Masaryk University alumni
20th-century Czech lawyers
Czech women lawyers
Permanent Representatives of the Czech Republic to the United Nations